Fantasy football may refer to: 

 Fantasy football (association), a game in which participants assemble an imaginary team of real life footballers (soccer players)
 Fantasy football (Australian rules), a fantasy sport version of Australian rules football
 Fantasy football (gridiron), a game in which the participants serve as general managers of virtual professional American football teams
 Fantasy Football League, a British television programme hosted by David Baddiel and Frank Skinner

See also
 Fantasy sport, a type of game, often played using the Internet, where participants assemble imaginary or virtual teams composed of proxies of real players of a professional sport